Harry Littlewood (23 May 1921 – 26 December 2003) was an English actor who has appeared in Coronation Street, George and Mildred, Z-Cars, Softly, Softly, The Saint, Never the Twain, Families, The Bill, Casualty, Bergerac and Howards' Way.

Filmography

Television roles

External links
 

1921 births
2003 deaths
Male actors from Manchester
English male soap opera actors